Túlio Gadêlha Sales de Melo (born 12 November 1987) is a Brazilian politician. A member of the party Rede Sustentabilidade (REDE), he has served as a federal deputy for Pernambuco since 2019.

Personal life
Gadêlha is an alumnus of Catholic University of Pernambuco. Since 2017 Gadêlha has been in a relationship with Grupo Globo journalist Fatima Bernardes. In his free time he is an avid surfer and beach goer.

Political career
Gadêlha contested in the 2014 election, but only received  3,495 votes and was not elected to office. Poit was elected to be federal deputy for his home state of Pernambuco, being elected with 75,642 votes in the 2018 election. Gadêlha has been previously a strong critic of Michel Temer.

References

1987 births
Living people
Politicians from Recife
Sustainability Network politicians
Members of the Chamber of Deputies (Brazil) from Pernambuco